St. Georges is a civil parish and village in the unitary authority of North Somerset, England. Its population in the 2011 census was 3,379.

The parish is a modern creation, the area having previously been part of the parish of Banwell.

The area has seen much new housing development in recent years, an extension of the development of the neighbouring North Worle.

Governance
The parish council has responsibility for local issues, including setting an annual precept (local rate) to cover the council’s operating costs and producing annual accounts for public scrutiny. The parish council evaluates local planning applications and works with the local police, district council officers, and neighbourhood watch groups on matters of crime, security, and traffic. The parish council's role also includes initiating projects for the maintenance and repair of parish facilities, such as the village hall or community centre, playing fields and playgrounds, as well as consulting with the district council on the maintenance, repair, and improvement of highways, drainage, footpaths, public transport, and street cleaning. Conservation matters (including trees and listed buildings) and environmental issues are also of interest to the council.

The parish falls within the ward of Banwell & Winscombe within the unitary authority of North Somerset which was created in 1996, as established by the Local Government Act 1992. It provides a single tier of local government with responsibility for almost all local government functions within their area including local planning and building control, local roads, council housing, environmental health, markets and fairs, refuse collection, recycling, cemeteries, crematoria, leisure services, parks, and tourism. They are also responsible for education, social services, libraries, main roads, public transport, trading standards, waste disposal and strategic planning, although fire, police and ambulance services are provided jointly with other authorities through the Avon Fire and Rescue Service, Avon and Somerset Constabulary and the South Western Ambulance Service.

North Somerset's area covers part of the ceremonial county of Somerset but it is administered independently of the non-metropolitan county. Its administrative headquarters are in the town hall in Weston-super-Mare. Between 1 April 1974 and 1 April 1996, it was the Woodspring district of the county of Avon. Before 1974 the parish was part of the Axbridge Rural District.

The parish is represented in the House of Commons of the Parliament of the United Kingdom as part of the Weston-super-Mare county constituency. It elects one Member of Parliament (MP) by the first past the post system of election.

Transport
The village is close to junction 21 of the M5 motorway.

A railway station at St Georges was opened by the Bristol and Exeter Railway on 14 June 1841. It was initially named "Banwell", but was renamed "Worle" when a new Sandford and Banwell railway station was opened on the Cheddar Valley Railway on 3 August 1869. A Worle Station was opened on the new Weston Loop Line on 1 March 1884, after which the station was renamed "Puxton". Following the closure of Worle, the station at St Georges became "Puxton and Worle" on 2 January 1922. It closed on 6 April 1964. The present day Worle railway station, opened 24 September 1990, is only a short distance from the village.

References

Villages in North Somerset
Civil parishes in Somerset